Anolis barbouri, the Hispaniolan hopping anole , is a species of lizard in the family Dactyloidae. The species is found in Hispaniola.

References

Anoles
Reptiles described in 1919
Reptiles of Haiti
Reptiles of the Dominican Republic
Taxa named by Karl Patterson Schmidt